20th Century Masters – The Millennium Collection: The Best of The Reverend Horton Heat is a retrospective compilation album by The Reverend Horton Heat. It was released by Interscope Records in January 2006. The album consists of remastered versions of tracks that appeared on the band's three Interscope albums, Liquor in the Front (1994), It's Martini Time (1996), and Space Heater (1998).

Track listing

Personnel
 Jim Heath (aka Rev. Horton Heat) – vocals, guitar
 Jimbo Wallace – upright bass
 Taz Bentley – drums
 Scott Churilla – percussion, drums
 Adam Abrams – production coordination
 Al Jourgensen – producer
 Gavin Lurssen – mastering
 Ryan Null – photo coordination
 Thom Panunzio – producer
 Lisa Peardon – photography
 Ken Settle – photography
 Dana Smart – compilation supervisor
 Ed Stasium – producer
 Dave Thompson – liner notes

References

The Reverend Horton Heat compilation albums
Reverend Horton Heat
Albums produced by Thom Panunzio
Albums produced by Al Jourgensen
Albums produced by Ed Stasium
2006 greatest hits albums
Interscope Records compilation albums